HOTAIR (for HOX transcript antisense RNA) is a human gene located between HOXC11 and HOXC12 on chromosome 12. It is the first example of an RNA expressed on one chromosome that has been found to influence transcription of HOXD cluster posterior genes located on chromosome 2. The sequence and function of HOTAIR is different in human and mouse.  Sequence analysis of HOTAIR revealed that it exists in mammals, has poorly conserved sequences and considerably conserved structures, and has evolved faster than nearby HoxC genes. A subsequent study identified HOTAIR has 32 nucleotide long conserved noncoding element (CNE) that has a paralogous copy in HOXD cluster region (located between HOXD11 and HOXD12), suggesting that the HOTAIR conserved sequences predates whole genome duplication events at the root of vertebrate. While the conserved sequence paralogous with HOXD cluster is 32 nucleotide long, the HOTAIR sequence conserved from human to fish is about 200 nucleotide long and is marked by active enhancer features (bidirectional transcription, H3K4me1 and H3K27ac peaks).

Gene and transcribed RNA product 
The HOTAIR gene contains 6,232 bp and encodes 2.2 kb long noncoding RNA molecule, which controls gene expression.  Its source DNA is located within a HOXC gene cluster.  It is shuttled from chromosome 12 to chromosome 2 by the Suz-Twelve protein.

Function 
The 5′ end of HOTAIR interacts with a Polycomb-group protein Polycomb Repressive Complex 2 (PRC2) and as a result regulates chromatin state. It is required for gene-silencing of the HOXD locus by PRC2. PRC2 is dispensable for HOTAIR-mediated transcriptional silencing. The 3′ end of HOTAIR interacts with the histone demethylase LSD1.

It is an important factor in the epigenetic differentiation of skin over the surface of the body. Skin from various anatomical positions is distinct, e.g. the skin of the eyelid differs markedly from that on the sole of the foot.

Clinical significance 
HOTAIR is highly expressed in metastatic breast cancers. High levels of expression in primary breast tumours are a significant predictor of subsequent metastasis and death. This is partially due to HOTAIR-mediated overexpression of the HER2 oncogene through sequestration of miR-331-3p, which is a negative regulator of HER2 expression. In cells, especially those that over express PRC2, the prevention of HOTAIR expression leads to a reduction in invasive potential of that cell. It is also involved in esophageal squamous cell carcinoma.

References

Further reading

External links 
 
 
 
 
 

Antisense RNA
Non-coding RNA